Alberta Provincial Highway No. 666, commonly referred to as Highway 666, is a highway in the province of Alberta, Canada. It runs mostly west-east, on mostly existing township and range roads in the Municipal District of Greenview No. 16 in Northern Alberta, for 37 km.

Route description 
Highway 666 travels north east on Township Road 692, Range Road 82, and Township Road 700, to the hamlet of Grovedale. It then follows the south bank of Wapiti River, with O'Brien Provincial Park in between, before meeting up with Highway 40. The Highway 40 bridge over Wapiti River south of Grande Prairie also crosses Highway 666, and with separate northbound and southbound exits to Hwy 666, it makes a Trumpet/Directional-T hybrid.

It is used by Forestry and the Oil and Gas industry working in the area of the Wapiti River valley, as well as for recreational use (two summer campgrounds are open in this wilderness area). It is paved for its entire length.

Major intersections 
Starting from the west end of Highway 666:

Gallery

See also

 List of Alberta provincial highways

References

External links

666